Serguei Petrovich Katchiourine (born August 29, 1973) is a Kyrgyzstani épée fencer. At age thirty-four, Katchiourine made his official debut for the 2008 Summer Olympics in Beijing, where he competed in the individual épée event. He lost the first preliminary match to France's Fabrice Jeannet, with a score of 14–15.

References

External links
 
NBC 2008 Olympics profile

Kyrgyzstani male épée fencers
Living people
Olympic fencers of Kyrgyzstan
Fencers at the 2008 Summer Olympics
1973 births
Kyrgyzstani people of Russian descent
Fencers at the 2010 Asian Games
Asian Games competitors for Kyrgyzstan
20th-century Kyrgyzstani people
21st-century Kyrgyzstani people